Do the Box is Do As Infinity's album box set after its disbanding. 10,000 copies were made, and each box has its own number printed on itself. It was released among five other different Do As Infinity items on the same day. The box included the six studio albums the band had previously released, as well as a bonus DVD named Do The Works. Do The Works contained two sections: the first one was a documentary of Do As Infinity's activities over the six years they were active, and the second section compiled the commercials for all of their CDs, starting from their debut single, "Tangerine Dream" up to Do the A-side.

Track listing

Disc 1 Break of Dawn

 "Break of Dawn"
 "Standing on the Hill"
 "Oasis"
 "Another"
 
 "Heart"
 "Raven"
 "Welcome!"
 "Painful"
 "Tangerine Dream"
 "Yesterday & Today"
Bonus Tracks
  Acoustic Version
 "Oasis" Acoustic Version

Disc 2 New World

 "New World (Album Mix)"
 "Guruguru"
 "Desire"
 "We Are."
 "Snail"
 
 "Rumble Fish"
 "Holiday"
 "135"
 "Wings 510"
 "Summer Days"
Bonus Track
 "Yesterday & Today" (Strings Orchestral Version)

Disc 3 Deep Forest

 
 
 
 "Get Yourself"
 
 
 
 "Week!"
 "Hang Out"
 
 
Bonus Track
  (Album Remix)

Disc 4 True Song

 
 "Under the Sun"
 "Good For You"
 "I Can't Be Myself"
 "Perfect Lady"
 
 "Grateful Journey"
 "One or Eight"
 "Sense of Life"
 
 
Secret Track
 (Third anniversary special live version)

Disc 5 Gates of Heaven

 "Gates of Heaven"
 
 
  
 
 
 "D/N/A"
 "Weeds"
 "Field of Dreams"
 
 "Thanksgiving Day"
Bonus Track
  (a-nation live)

Disc 6 Need Your Love

 "For the Future"
 "Blue"
 "Be Free"
 
 "Ever.."
 "One Flesh"
 "Robot"
 
 "Ultimate G.V"
 "Need Your Love"
 
Bonus Track
  Acoustic Version

Special DVD Do The Works
 "6 years band documentary"
 "6 years commercial collection"

Chart positions

External links
 Do the Box at Avex Network
 Do the Box at Oricon

Do As Infinity albums
2006 compilation albums
2006 video albums
Avex Group compilation albums
Avex Group video albums
Documentary films about rock music and musicians
Albums produced by Seiji Kameda